Arnold Böcklin (16 October 182716 January 1901) was a Swiss symbolist painter.

Biography

He was born in Basel. His father, Christian Frederick Böcklin (b. 1802), was descended from an old family of Schaffhausen, and engaged in the silk trade. His mother, Ursula Lippe, was a native of the same city. Arnold studied at the Düsseldorf academy under Schirmer, and became a friend of Anselm Feuerbach. He is associated with the Düsseldorf school of painting. Schirmer, who recognized in him a student of exceptional promise, sent him to Antwerp and Brussels, where he copied the works of Flemish and Dutch masters. Böcklin then went to Paris, worked at the Louvre, and painted several landscapes.

After serving his time in the army, Böcklin set out for Rome in March 1850. The many sights of Rome were a fresh stimulus to his mind. These new influences brought allegorical and mythological figures into his compositions. In 1856 he returned to Munich, and remained there for four years.

His first fiancée died young. A second woman declined to marry. In Rome, he married Angela Rosa Lorenza Pascucci in 1853. The couple had fourteen children, but five died in childhood and another three died before Böcklin. He himself nearly succumbed to typhoid in 1859.

Career

He then exhibited the Great Park, one of his earliest works, in which he treated ancient mythology. Of this period are his Nymph and Satyr, Heroic Landscape (Diana Hunting), both of 1858, and Sappho (1859). These works, which were much discussed, together with Lenbach's recommendation, gained him appointment as professor at the Weimar academy. He held the office for two years, painting the Venus and Love, a Portrait of Lenbach, and a Saint Catherine.

He returned to Rome from 1862 to 1866, and there gave his fancy and his taste for violent colour free play in his Portrait of Mme Böcklin, and in An Anchorite in the Wilderness (1863), a Roman Tavern, and Villa on the Seashore (1864). He returned to Basel in 1866 to finish his frescoes in the gallery, and to paint, besides several portraits, The Magdalene with Christ (1868), Anacreon's Muse (1869), and A Castle and Warriors (1871). His Portrait of Myself, with Death playing a violin (1872), was painted after his return again to Munich, where he exhibited Battle of the Centaurs, Landscape with Moorish Horsemen and A Farm (1875). From 1876 to 1885 Böcklin was working at Florence, and painted a Pietà, Ulysses and Calypso, Prometheus, and the Sacred Grove.

From 1886 to 1892 he settled at Zürich, after which he resided at San Domenico, near Florence. From this period are the Naiads at Play, A Sea Idyll, and War.

Böcklin died on 16 January 1901 in Fiesole. He is buried in the Cimitero degli Allori in the southern suburb of Florence, Italy.

Symbolism

Influenced by Romanticism, Böcklin's symbolist use of imagery derived from mythology and legend often overlapped with the aesthetic of the Pre-Raphaelites. Many of his paintings are imaginative interpretations of the classical world, or portray mythological subjects in settings involving classical architecture, often allegorically exploring death and mortality in the context of a strange, fantasy world.

Böcklin is best known for his five versions (painted 1880 to 1886) of the Isle of the Dead, which partly evokes the English Cemetery, Florence, which was close to his studio and where his baby daughter Maria had been buried. An early version of the painting was commissioned by a Madame Berna, a widow who wanted a painting with a dreamlike atmosphere.

Clement Greenberg wrote in 1947 that Böcklin's work "is one of the most consummate expressions of all that is now disliked about the latter half of the nineteenth century."

Legacy

Böcklin influenced Giorgio de Chirico, who said "Each of Böcklin's works is a shock", and other Surrealist painters like Max Ernst and Salvador Dalí. When asked who was his favorite painter, Marcel Duchamp controversially named Arnold Böcklin as having a major influence on his art. Whether Duchamp was serious in this assertion is still debated.

H. R. Giger has created a picture called Homage to Boecklin, based upon Isle of the Dead.

Several of his works are part of the collection of the Kunstmuseum Basel and exhibited there. There is currently also a room in the Kunsthaus Zürich dedicated to his work.

In music

Böcklin's paintings, especially Isle of the Dead, inspired several late-Romantic composers.

 Gustav Mahler's song Des Antonius von Padua Fischpredigt (St. Anthony's Sermon to the Fish) from his Des Knaben Wunderhorn song cycle, which also appears as the Scherzo movement in Mahler's Symphony No. 2 (Mahler) was inspired by Böcklin's 1892 painting, St. Anthony Preaching to the Fish.
In 1891, Portuguese pianist José Vianna da Motta composed two pieces on Böcklin's paintings Meeresidylle and Im Spiel der Wellen.
 Sergei Rachmaninoff (see Isle of the Dead) and Heinrich Schulz-Beuthen both composed symphonic poems after it. Rachmaninoff was also inspired by Böcklin's painting Die Heimkehr ("The Homecoming" or "The Return") when writing his Prelude in B minor, Op. 32, No. 10.
 Andreas Hallén, a Swedish Romantic composer, wrote a symphonic poem Die Toteninsel in 1898.
 In 1903, Austrian, later American, composer Karl Weigl composed a tone poem for piano "Die Toteninsel".
 In 1913 Max Reger composed a set of Four Tone Poems after Böcklin with the movements "Der geigende Eremit", "Im Spiel der Wellen", "Die Toteninsel", and "Bacchanal".
 In Mark Robson's film Isle of the Dead (1945), Disney composer Leigh Harline's somber score makes use of Sergei Rachmaninoff's music.
 Hans Huber's second symphony is entitled Böcklin-Sinfonie, after the artist and his paintings.
 Felix Woyrsch composed 3 Böcklin Phantasies (Die Toteninsel, Der Eremit, Im Spiel der Wellen), Op. 53 (1910).
 Fulvio Caldini composed L'isola di Böcklin, his Op.85 for electronic instruments (2001).

Other
Otto Weisert designed an Art Nouveau typeface in 1904 and named it "Arnold Böcklin" in his honor.

Adolf Hitler was fond of Böcklin's work, at one time owning 11 of his paintings.

Roger Zelazny titled one of his novels Isle of the Dead after Böcklin's paintings, and an Ace books edition featured a cover painting by Dean Ellis that was deliberately reminiscent of Böcklin's work.

Yemelyan Yaroslavsky, Academician of the Academy of Sciences of the Soviet Union, opened his 1942 laudatory article on Dmitry Shostakovich's Seventh Symphony with an allusion to Böcklin's painting "War".

Works

References

External links

 
 
 
 
 Bocklin in "History of Art"
 Böcklin biography and images at CGFA
 A gallery of art from Arnold Böcklin
 70 different engravings by Arnold Böcklin on display with translations (Archived 2009-10-25)
German masters of the nineteenth century : paintings and drawings from the Federal Republic of Germany, a full text exhibition catalog from the Metropolitan Museum of Art, which contains material on Arnold Böcklin (nos. 5–10)
"Brahms, Böcklin, and the Gesang der Parzen", by Eftychia Papanikolaou; article in Music in Art: International Journal for Music Iconography 30/1-2 (Spring-Fall 2005): 154–165.

1827 births
1901 deaths
Artists from Basel-Stadt
Symbolist painters
19th-century Swiss painters
Swiss male painters
Kunstakademie Düsseldorf alumni
Düsseldorf school of painting
19th-century Swiss male artists